James Keers (10 December 1931 – 27 April 2020) was an English footballer who scored 15 goals from 73 appearances in the Football League Third Division North playing on the wing for Darlington in the 1950s. He also played non-league football for clubs including Evenwood Town and Annfield Plain.

References

1931 births
2020 deaths
People from Stanley, County Durham
Footballers from County Durham
English footballers
Association football forwards
Spennymoor Town F.C. players
Darlington F.C. players
Annfield Plain F.C. players
English Football League players